The Mint Million is a Grade III American Thoroughbred horse race for three years olds and older, over a distance of one mile on the turf held annually in September at Kentucky Downs racetrack in Franklin, Kentucky during their short turf meeting.  The event currently carries an offered purse of $1,000,000 and is sponsored by WinStar Farm.

History 
The inaugural running of the event was on 11 October 1992 as the Sanford Duncan Stakes at a distance of about one mile. The event was named after an early settler in the area, Sanford Duncan who had built an Inn in 1818 which was on the Lexington to Nashville road adjacent to where the Dueling Grounds race track is located today.

The event was not held in 1996 and 1997 due to the race track being closed while it was being auctioned.

In 1998 new ownership of the race track revived the event as part of the Kentucky Cup, which interlaced races from Turfway Park and the newly renamed Kentucky Downs. The event was scheduled as a handicap and was known as the Kentucky Cup Mile Handicap. In 2002 the conditions of the event were changed from handicap to stakes allowance and the name of the event was modified.

In 2005 and 2006 the event was not scheduled as part of the Kentucky Cup program. In 2007 the event was revived as the Franklin Stakes and in 2008 the event was held as the Franklin-Simpson Stakes in honor of the city and county where the Kentucky Downs racetrack is located. For the 2012 and 2013 runnings the event was known as the Franklin-Simpson Mile Stakes.

In 2014 the event was renamed once again to the More Than Ready Mile Stakes in honor of G1 King's Bishop Stakes winner More than Ready who stood at WinStar Farm from 2013. More Than Ready became the number 1 sire of Breeders' Cup wins with seven. The 2014 winner Regally Ready was sired also by More Than Ready.

With the influx of gaming revenue at Kentucky Downs the purse for the event has risen dramatically to $300,000 offered by 2014.

In 2017 the event was renamed to the Tourist Mile Stakes after the 2015 winner of the event, Tourist who went onto win the Breeders' Cup Mile at Santa Anita Park. Tourist was part-owned by WinStar Farm and is currently active at the stud.

In 2021 the event was upgraded by the Thoroughbred Owners and Breeders Association to a Grade III. For the 2021 running Kentucky Downs raised the purse to $1 million and renamed the event to the Mint Million sponsored by WinStar Farm.

Records
Speed record: 
 1 mile – 1:32.21 Flavius (2020)

Margins: 
  lengths – Depeche Chat  (2012)

Most wins by a jockey:  
 2 – Jose Valdivia Jr. (2007, 2017)
 2 – Julio García (2011, 2018)
 2 – Julien Leparoux (2016, 2019)

Most wins by a trainer:
 2 – Walter M. Bindner Jr. (1993, 1995)
 2 – William I. Mott (2000, 2015)   
 2 – Wesley A. Ward (2011, 2018)   
 2 – Steven M. Asmussen (2014, 2019)
 2  – Michael J. Maker (2016, 2022)

Most wins by an owner:
 3 – Kenneth L. and Sarah K. Ramsey (2011, 2013, 2016)

Winners

See also
List of American and Canadian Graded races

References 

Kentucky Downs
Graded stakes races in the United States
Grade 3 stakes races in the United States
Recurring sporting events established in 1992
1992 establishments in Kentucky
Horse races in Kentucky
Turf races in the United States
Open mile category horse races